Arthur Mervyn Sanger (26 March 1918 – 3 December 1999) was an Australian rules footballer who played with Carlton in the Victorian Football League (VFL).

From Daylesford, Sanger was a back pocket specialist, who kicked the only goal of his league career when he came on as 19th man for a match against Footscray in his second season. Carlton were VFL premiers in Sanger's first and last seasons, but he wasn't selected for either side. He was however a member of their 1945 premiership team, playing from the back pocket in the famed 'Bloodbath' Grand Final. His career ended when he suffered a badly broken arm in 1947.

Sanger was appointed coach of the Carlton Under 19 team in 1951 and guided them to a Premiership in his first year.

Notes

References

Arthur Sanger's profile at Blueseum
Arthur Sanger's obituary

1918 births
1999 deaths
Australian rules footballers from Victoria (Australia)
Carlton Football Club players
Carlton Football Club Premiership players
Castlemaine Football Club players
Daylesford Football Club players
One-time VFL/AFL Premiership players